Gehrde is a municipality in the district of Osnabrück, in Lower Saxony, Germany.

References

Osnabrück (district)